Willie Ripia (born 20 August 1985) is a rugby union player. He plays as a first five-eighth. He was born in Murupara, New Zealand. Ripia attended Rotorua Boys' High School.

Ripia started his Super 14 career at the Highlanders before moving to the Hurricanes. He also played for Taranaki in the NPC. Ripia has played for New Zealand at U-19 and U-21 levels, and also for New Zealand Maori. In August 2010 he declared his intention to play for Australia when he qualifies on residency. He signed a 2-year contract at the Western Force, but resigned in January 2012 following a serious breach of protocol. Ripia currently plays as a first five-eighth for the Bay of Plenty Steamers in the ITM Cup

Domestic career 
Ripia made his Waikato debut in 2005, but playing behind a logjam of backline talent, in particular Stephen Donald at flyhalf, and an injury setback early in his second year after he ruptured his Achilles tendon playing against Auckland early in 2006, demanding a lengthy rehabilitation period.

Ripia started his Super Rugby career with the Highlanders after he was called into the squad in 2006 as an injury replacement to Nick Evans, making one appearance off the bench against the Western Force.

Ripia moved to Taranaki at the end of the 2007 Air New Zealand Cup with the promise of more regular game time at Taranaki than was on offer at Waikato.

In 2008 Ripia came to the Hurricanes as a franchise player for Taranaki. Starting the season on the reserves, he broke into the Hurricanes starting fifteen against the Lions in round twelve, finishing the last four games of the season including the 2008 semi-final against the Crusaders wearing the No. 10 jersey.

He impressed again in 2009 with a series of reliable performances throughout the second half of the competition, also scoring 80 points and kicking at almost 75 percent.

Ripia surpassed 150 Super 14 points in his third season in the Hurricanes in 2010.

He then went on and signed a 2-year contract at the Western Force, but resigned in January 2012.
He was recruited by the Force in 2010 as a foreign development player, which meant he could eventually qualify for Australia. He missed much of last season with foot and calf injuries but played a solid role in the team's surge near the end of their 2011 campaign.

He was subsequently released early from the Force for a misdemeanour, making a tentative return to top-class rugby for the 2012 Bay of Plenty Development XV.

Ripia signed for the Bay of Plenty Steamers for the ITM Cup 2013 season.

Personal life 
According to the Sydney Morning Herald and other news sources, it was alleged by Western Force officials that Ripia had stolen money from other players at the club's facilities. Ripia initially denied any involvement, but resigned after being shown CCTV footage of the changing rooms. It was subsequently reported that Ripia had returned to New Zealand and was seeking treatment for problem gambling.

References

External links
Hurricanes profile

1985 births
Living people
Hurricanes (rugby union) players
Highlanders (rugby union) players
Western Force players
Waikato rugby union players
Taranaki rugby union players
Bay of Plenty rugby union players
Wellington rugby union players
New Zealand rugby union players
Rugby union fly-halves
Māori All Blacks players
People educated at Rotorua Boys' High School
New Zealand expatriate rugby union players
New Zealand expatriate sportspeople in Australia
Expatriate rugby union players in Australia
People from Murupara
Rugby union players from Whakatāne